The suppression of the Jesuits was the removal of all members of the Society of Jesus from most of the countries of Western Europe and their colonies beginning in 1759, and the abolition of the order by the Holy See in 1773. The Jesuits were serially expelled from the Portuguese Empire (1759), France (1764), the Two Sicilies, Malta, Parma, the Spanish Empire (1767) and Austria, and Hungary (1782).

Political manoeuvrings both in Rome and within each country involved influenced this timeline. The papacy reluctantly acceded to the anti-Jesuit demands of various Catholic kingdoms while providing minimal theological justification for the suppressions.

Historians identify multiple factors causing the suppression. The Jesuits, who were not above getting involved in politics, were distrusted for their closeness to the pope and his power in independent nations' religious and political affairs. In France, it was a combination of many influences, from Jansenism to free-thought, to the then prevailing impatience with the Ancien Régime. Monarchies attempting to centralise and secularise political power viewed the Jesuits as supranational, too strongly allied to the papacy, and too autonomous from the monarchs in whose territory they operated.

With his papal brief, Dominus ac Redemptor (21 July 1773), Pope Clement XIV suppressed the Society as a fait accompli. However, the order did not disappear. It continued underground operations in China, Russia, Prussia, and the United States. In Russia, Catherine the Great allowed the founding of a new novitiate. In 1814, a subsequent Pope, Pius VII, acted to restore the Society of Jesus to its previous provinces, and the Jesuits began to resume their work in those countries.

Background to suppression
Before the eighteenth-century suppression of the Jesuits in many countries, there had been earlier bans, such as in territories of the Venetian Republic between 1606 and 1656–1657, begun and ended as part of disputes between the Republic and the papacy, beginning with the Venetian Interdict.

By the mid-18th century, the Society had acquired a European reputation for political maneuvering and economic success. Monarchs in many European states grew increasingly wary of what they saw as undue interference from a foreign entity. The expulsion of Jesuits from their states had the added benefit of allowing governments to impound the Society's accumulated wealth and possessions. However, historian Gibson (1966) cautions, "[h]ow far this served as a motive for the expulsion we do not know."

Various states took advantage of different events to take action. The series of political struggles between various monarchs, particularly France and Portugal, began with disputes over territory in 1750 and culminated in the suspension of diplomatic relations and the dissolution of the Society by the Pope over most of Europe, and even some executions. The Portuguese Empire, France, the Two Sicilies, Parma, and the Spanish Empire were involved to a different extent.

The conflicts began with trade disputes in 1750 in Portugal, 1755 in France, and the late 1750s in the Two Sicilies. In 1758 the government of Joseph I of Portugal took advantage of the waning powers of Pope Benedict XIV and deported Jesuits from South America after relocating them with their native workers and then fighting a brief conflict, formally suppressing the order in 1759. In 1762 the Parlement Français (a court, not a legislature) ruled against the Society in a huge bankruptcy case under pressure from a host of groups – from within the Church but also secular notables such as Madame de Pompadour, the king's mistress. Austria and the Two Sicilies suppressed the order by decree in 1767.

Lead-up to suppression

First national suppression: Portugal and its empire in 1759

There were long-standing tensions between the Portuguese crown and the Jesuits, which increased when the Count of Oeiras (later the Marquis of Pombal) became the monarch's minister of state, culminating in the expulsion of the Jesuits in 1759. The Távora affair in 1758 could be considered a pretext for the expulsion and crown confiscation of Jesuit assets. According to historians James Lockhart and Stuart B. Schwartz, the Jesuits' "independence, power, wealth, control of education, and ties to Rome made the Jesuits obvious targets for Pombal's brand of extreme regalism."

Portugal's quarrel with the Jesuits began over an exchange of South American colonial territory with Spain. By a secret treaty of 1750, Portugal relinquished to Spain the contested Colonia del Sacramento at the mouth of the Rio de la Plata in exchange for the Seven Reductions of Paraguay. These autonomous Jesuit missions had been nominal Spanish colonial territory. The native Guaraní, who lived in the mission territories, were ordered to quit their country and settle across Uruguay. The Guaraní rose in arms against the transfer due to the harsh conditions, and the so-called Guaraní War ensued. It was a disaster for the Guaraní. In Portugal, a battle escalated, with inflammatory pamphlets denouncing or defending the Jesuits, who, for over a century, had protected the Guarani from enslavement through a network of Reductions, as depicted in The Mission. The Portuguese colonizers secured the expulsion of the Jesuits.

On 1 April 1758, Pombal persuaded the aged Pope Benedict XIV to appoint the Portuguese Cardinal Saldanha to investigate allegations against the Jesuits. Benedict was skeptical about the gravity of the alleged abuses. He ordered a "minute inquiry", but to safeguard the Society's reputation, all serious matters were to be referred back to him. Benedict died the following month, on May 3. On May 15, Saldanha, having received the papal brief only a fortnight before, declared that the Jesuits were guilty of having exercised "illicit, public, and scandalous commerce" in Portugal and its colonies. He had not visited Jesuit houses as ordered and pronounced on the issues the pope had reserved for himself.

Pombal implicated the Jesuits in the Távora affair, an attempted assassination of the king on 3 September 1758, on the grounds of their friendship with some of the supposed conspirators. On 19 January 1759, he issued a decree sequestering the property of the Society in the Portuguese dominions. The following September, he deported the Portuguese fathers, about one thousand in number, to the Pontifical States, keeping the foreigners in prison. Among those arrested and executed was the then denounced Gabriel Malagrida, the Jesuit confessor of Leonor of Távora, for "crimes against the faith". After Malagrida's execution in 1759, the Portuguese crown suppressed the Society. The Portuguese ambassador was recalled from Rome, and the papal nuncio was expelled. Diplomatic relations between Portugal and Rome were broken off until 1770.

Suppression in France in 1764
The suppression of the Jesuits in France began in the French island colony of Martinique, where the Society of Jesus had a commercial stake in sugar plantations worked by black slaves and free labor. Their large mission plantations included large local populations that worked under the usual conditions of tropical colonial agriculture of the 18th century. The Catholic Encyclopedia in 1908 said that the practice of the missionaries occupying themselves personally in selling off the goods produced (an anomaly for a religious order) "was allowed partly to provide for the current expenses of the mission, partly to protect the simple, childlike natives from the common plague of dishonest intermediaries."

Father Antoine La Vallette, Superior of the Martinique missions, borrowed money to expand the extensive undeveloped resources of the colony. But on the outbreak of war with England, ships carrying goods of an estimated value of 2,000,000 livres were captured, and La Vallette suddenly went bankrupt for a substantial sum. His creditors turned to the Jesuit procurator in Paris to demand payment. Still, he refused responsibility for the debts of an independent mission – though he offered to negotiate for a settlement. The creditors went to the courts and received a favorable decision in 1760, obliging the Society to pay and giving leave to distrain in the case of non-payment. On the advice of their lawyers, the Jesuits appealed to the Parlement of Paris. This turned out to be an imprudent step for their interests. Not only did the Parlement support the lower court on 8 May 1761, but having once gotten the case into its hands, the Jesuits' opponents in that assembly determined to strike a blow at the Order.

The Jesuits had many who opposed them. The Jansenists were numerous among the enemies of the orthodox party. The Sorbonne, an educational rival, joined the Gallicans, the Philosophes, and the Encyclopédistes. Louis XV was weak; his wife and children were in favor of the Jesuits; his able first minister, the Duc de Choiseul, played into the hands of the Parlement and the royal mistress, Madame de Pompadour, to whom the Jesuits had refused absolution for she was living in sin with the King of France, was a determined opponent. The determination of the Parlement of Paris in time bore down all opposition.

The attack on the Jesuits was opened on 17 April 1762 by the Jansenist sympathizer the Abbé Chauvelin, who denounced the Constitution of the Society of Jesus, which was publicly examined and discussed in a hostile press. The Parlement issued its Extraits des assertions assembled from passages from Jesuit theologians and canonists, in which they were alleged to teach every sort of immorality and error. On 6 August 1762, the final arrêt was proposed to the Parlement by the Advocate General Joly de Fleury, condemning the Society to extinction. Still, the king's intervention brought eight months delay, and in the meantime, a compromise was suggested by the Court. If the French Jesuits separated from the Society headed by the Jesuit General directly under the pope's authority and came under a French vicar, with French customs, as with the Gallican Church, the Crown would still protect them. The French Jesuits, rejecting Gallicanism, refused to consent. On 1 April 1763, the colleges were closed, and by a further arrêt of March 9, 1764, the Jesuits were required to renounce their vows under pain of banishment. At the end of November 1764, the king signed an edict dissolving the Society throughout his dominions, for some provincial parlements still protected them, as in Franche-Comté, Alsace, and Artois. In the draft of the edict, he canceled numerous clauses that implied that the Society was guilty, and writing to Choiseul, he concluded: "If I adopt the advice of others for the peace of my realm, you must make the changes I propose, or I will do nothing. I say no more, lest I should say too much."

Decline of the Jesuits in New France
Following the British 1759 victory against the French in Quebec, France lost its North American territory of New France, where Jesuit missionaries in the seventeenth century had been active among indigenous peoples. British rule had implications for Jesuits in New France, but their numbers and sites were already in decline. As early as 1700, the Jesuits had adopted a policy of merely maintaining their existing posts instead of trying to establish new ones beyond Quebec, Montreal, and Ottawa. Once New France was under British control, the British barred the immigration of any further Jesuits. By 1763, only twenty-one Jesuits were still stationed in what was now the British colony of Quebec. By 1773, only eleven Jesuits remained. The British crown claimed Jesuit property in Canada in the same year and declared that the Society of Jesus in New France was dissolved.

Spanish Empire suppression of 1767

Events leading to the Spanish suppression

The Suppression in Spain and the Spanish colonies, and in its dependency the Kingdom of Naples, was the last of the expulsions, with Portugal (1759) and France (1764) having already set the pattern. The Spanish crown had already begun a series of administrative and other changes in their overseas empire, such as reorganizing the viceroyalties, rethinking economic policies, and establishing a military, so the expulsion of the Jesuits is seen as part of this general trend known generally as the Bourbon Reforms. The reforms aimed to curb American-born Spaniards' increasing autonomy and self-confidence, reassert crown control, and increase revenues. Some historians doubt that the Jesuits were guilty of intrigues against the Spanish crown that were used as the immediate cause for the expulsion.

Contemporaries in Spain attributed the suppression of the Jesuits to the Esquilache Riots, named after the Italian advisor to Bourbon king Carlos III, that erupted after a sumptuary law was enacted. The law, placing restrictions on men's wearing of voluminous capes and limiting the breadth of sombreros the men could wear, was seen as an "insult to Castilian pride."

King Carlos fled to the countryside when an angry crowd of those resisters converged on the royal palace. The crowd shouted, "Long Live Spain! Death to Esquilache!" His Flemish palace guard fired warning shots over the people's heads. An account says that a group of Jesuit priests appeared on the scene, soothed the protesters with speeches, and sent them home. Carlos decided to rescind the tax hike and hat-trimming edict and fire his finance minister.

The monarch and his advisers were alarmed by the uprising, which challenged royal authority. The Jesuits were accused of inciting the mob and publicly accusing the monarch of religious crimes. Pedro Rodríguez de Campomanes, attorney for the Council of Castile, the body overseeing central Spain, articulated this view in a report the king read. Charles III ordered convening a special royal commission to draw up a master plan to expel the Jesuits. The commission first met in January 1767. It modeled its plan on the tactics deployed by France's Philip IV against the Knights Templar in 1307 – emphasizing the element of surprise. Charles's adviser Campomanes had written a treatise on the Templars in 1747, which may have informed the implementation of the Jesuit suppression. One historian states, "Charles III never would have dared to expel the Jesuits had he not been assured of the support of an influential party within the Spanish Church." Jansenists and mendicant orders had long opposed the Jesuits and sought to curtail their power.

Secret plan of expulsion

King Charles's ministers kept their deliberations to themselves, as did the king, who acted upon "urgent, just, and necessary reasons, which I reserve in my royal mind." The correspondence of Bernardo Tanucci, Charles's anti-clerical minister in Naples, contains the ideas that, from time to time, guided Spanish policy. Charles conducted his government through the Count of Aranda, a reader of Voltaire, and other liberals.

The commission's meeting on 29 January 1767 planned the expulsion of the Jesuits. Secret orders, to be opened at sunrise on April 2, were sent to all provincial viceroys and district military commanders in Spain. Each sealed envelope contained two documents. One was a copy of the original order expelling "all members of the Society of Jesus" from Charles's Spanish domains and confiscating all their goods. The other instructed local officials to surround the Jesuit colleges and residences on the night of April 2, arrest the Jesuits, and arrange their passage to ships awaiting them at various ports. King Carlos' closing sentence read: "If a single Jesuit, even though sick or dying, is still to be found in the area under your command after the embarkation, prepare yourself to face summary execution."

Pope Clement XIII, presented with a similar ultimatum by the Spanish ambassador to the Vatican a few days before the decree would take effect, asked King Charles, "by what authority?" and threatened him with eternal damnation. Pope Clement could not enforce his protest, and the expulsion occurred as planned.

Jesuits expelled from Mexico (New Spain)

In New Spain, the Jesuits had actively evangelized the Indians on the northern frontier. But their main activity involved educating elite criollo (American-born Spanish) men, many of whom themselves became Jesuits. Of the 678 Jesuits expelled from Mexico, 75% were Mexican-born. In late June 1767, Spanish soldiers removed the Jesuits from their 16 missions and 32 stations in Mexico. No Jesuit could be excepted from the king's decree, no matter how old or ill. Many died on the trek along the cactus-studded trail to the Gulf Coast port of Veracruz, where ships awaited them to transport them to Italian exile.

There were protests in Mexico at the exile of so many Jesuit members of elite families. But the Jesuits themselves obeyed the order. Since the Jesuits had owned extensive landed estates in Mexico – which supported their evangelization of indigenous peoples and their education mission to criollo elites – the properties became a source of wealth for the crown. The crown auctioned them off, benefiting the treasury, and their criollo purchasers gained productive well-run properties. Many criollo families felt outraged at the crown's actions, regarding it as a "despotic act." One well-known Mexican Jesuit, Francisco Javier Clavijero, during his Italian exile, wrote an important history of Mexico, with emphasis on the indigenous peoples. Alexander von Humboldt, the famous German scientist who spent a year in Mexico in 1803–04, praised Clavijero's work on the history of Mexico's indigenous peoples.

Due to the isolation of the Spanish missions on the Baja California peninsula, the expulsion decree did not arrive in Baja California in June 1767, as in the rest of New Spain. It got delayed until the new governor, Gaspar de Portolá, arrived with the news and decree on November 30. By 3 February 1768, Portolá's soldiers had removed the peninsula's 16 Jesuit missionaries from their posts and gathered them in Loreto, whence they sailed to the Mexican mainland and thence to Europe. Showing sympathy for the Jesuits, Portolá treated them kindly, even as he ended their 70 years of mission-building in Baja, California. The Jesuit missions in Baja California were turned over to the Franciscans and subsequently to the Dominicans, and the future missions in Alta California were founded by Franciscans.

The change in the Spanish colonies in the New World was particularly great, as missions often dominated the far-flung settlements. Almost overnight, in the mission towns of Sonora and Arizona, the "black robes" (Jesuits) disappeared, and the "gray robes" (Franciscans) replaced them.

Expulsion from the Philippines
The royal decree expelling the Society of Jesus from Spain and its dominions reached Manila on 17 May 1768. Between 1769 and 1771, the Jesuits were transported from the Spanish East Indies to Spain and deported to Italy.

Exile of Spanish Jesuits to Italy

Spanish soldiers rounded up the Jesuits in Mexico, marched them to the coasts, and placed them below the decks of Spanish warships headed for the Italian port of Civitavecchia in the Papal States. When they arrived, Pope Clement XIII refused to allow the ships to unload their prisoners onto papal territory. Fired upon by batteries of artillery from the shore of Civitavecchia, the Spanish warships had to look for an anchorage off the island of Corsica, then a dependency of Genoa. But since a rebellion had erupted on Corsica, it took five months for some of the Jesuits to set foot on land.

Several historians have estimated the number of Jesuits deported at 6,000. But it is unclear whether this figure encompasses Spain alone or extends to Spain's overseas colonies (notably Mexico and the Philippines). Jesuit historian Hubert Becher claims that about 600 Jesuits died during their voyage and waiting ordeal.

In Naples, king Carlos' minister Bernardo Tanucci pursued a similar policy: On November 3, the Jesuits, with no accusation or trial, were marched across the border into the Papal States and threatened with death if they returned.

Historian Charles Gibson calls the Spanish crown's expulsion of the Jesuits a "sudden and devastating move" to assert royal control. However, the Jesuits became a vulnerable target for the crown's moves to assert more control over the church; also, some religious and diocesan clergy and civil authorities were hostile to them, and they did not protest their expulsion.

In addition to 1767, the Jesuits were suppressed and banned twice more in Spain, in 1834 and 1932. Spanish ruler Francisco Franco rescinded the last suppression in 1938.

Economic impact on the Spanish Empire
The suppression of the order had longstanding economic effects in the Americas, particularly those areas where they had their missions or reductions – outlying areas dominated by indigenous peoples such as Paraguay and Chiloé Archipelago. In Misiones, in modern-day Argentina, their suppression led to the scattering and enslavement of indigenous Guaranís living in the reductions and a long-term decline in the yerba mate industry, from which it only recovered in the 20th century.

In Ocoa, Valparaíso Region, Chile, folklore says Jesuits left behind a large entierro following their suppression.

With the suppression of the Society of Jesus in Spanish America, Jesuit vineyards in Peru were auctioned, but new owners did not have the same expertise as the Jesuits, contributing to a decline in production of wine and pisco.

Suppression in Malta

Malta was at the time a vassal of the Kingdom of Sicily, and Grandmaster Manuel Pinto da Fonseca, himself a Portuguese, followed suit, expelling the Jesuits from the island and seizing their assets. These assets were used in establishing the University of Malta by a decree signed by Pinto on 22 November 1769, with a lasting effect on Malta's social and cultural life. The Church of the Jesuits (in Maltese ), one of the oldest churches in Valletta, retains this name up to the present.

Expulsion from the Duchy of Parma
The independent Duchy of Parma was the smallest Bourbon court. So aggressive in its anti-clericalism was the Parmesan reaction to the news of the expulsion of the Jesuits from Naples, that Pope Clement XIII addressed a public warning against it on 30 January 1768, threatening the Duchy with ecclesiastical censures. At this, all the Bourbon courts turned against the Holy See, demanding the entire dissolution of the Jesuits. Parma expelled the Jesuits from its territories, confiscating their possessions.

Dissolution in Poland and Lithuania
The Jesuit order was disbanded in the Polish–Lithuanian Commonwealth in 1773. However, in the territories occupied by the Russian Empire in the First Partition of Poland the Society was not disbanded, as Russian Empress Catherine dismissed the Papal order. In the Commonwealth, many of the Society's possessions were taken over by the Commission of National Education, the world's first Ministry of Education. Lithuania complied with the suppression.

Papal suppression of 1773
After the suppression of the Jesuits in many European countries and their overseas empires, Pope Clement XIV issued a papal brief on 21 July 1773 in Rome titled: Dominus ac Redemptor Noster. That decree included the following statement.

Resistance in Belgium
After papal suppression in 1773, the scholarly Jesuit Society of Bollandists moved from Antwerp to Brussels, where they continued their work in the monastery of the Coudenberg; in 1788, the Bollandist Society was suppressed by the Austrian government of the Low Countries.

Continued Jesuit work in Prussia
Frederick the Great of Prussia refused to allow the papal document of suppression to be distributed in his country. The order continued in Prussia for several years after the suppression, although it had dissolved before the 1814 restoration.

Continued work in North America
Many individual Jesuits continued their work as Jesuits in Quebec, although the last one died in 1800. The 21 Jesuits living in North America signed a document offering their submission to Rome in 1774. In the United States, schools and colleges continued to be run and founded by Jesuits.

Russian resistance to suppression
In Imperial Russia, Catherine the Great refused to allow the papal document of suppression to be distributed and even openly defended the Jesuits from dissolution. The Jesuit chapter in Belarus received her patronage. It ordained priests, operated schools, and opened housing for novitiates and tertianships. Catherine's successor, Paul I, successfully asked Pope Pius VII in 1801 for formal approval of the Jesuit operation in Russia. The Jesuits, led first by Gabriel Gruber and after his death by Tadeusz Brzozowski, continued to expand in Russia under Alexander I, adding missions and schools in Astrakhan, Moscow, Riga, Saratov, and St. Petersburg and throughout the Caucasus and Siberia. Many former Jesuits throughout Europe traveled to Russia to join the sanctioned order there.

Alexander I withdrew his patronage of the Jesuits in 1812, but with the restoration of the Society in 1814, that only temporarily affected the order. Alexander eventually expelled all Jesuits from Imperial Russia in March 1820.

Russian patronage of restoration in Europe and North America
Under the patronage of the "Russian Society", Jesuit provinces were effectively reconstituted in the Kingdom of Great Britain in 1803, the Kingdom of the Two Sicilies in 1803, and the United States in 1805. "Russian" chapters were also formed in Belgium, Italy, the Netherlands, and Switzerland.

Acquiescence in Austria and Hungary
The Secularization Decree of Joseph II (Holy Roman Emperor from 1765 to 1790 and ruler of the Habsburg lands from 1780 to 1790) issued on 12 January 1782 for Austria and Hungary banned several monastic orders not involved in teaching or healing. It liquidated 140 monasteries (home to 1484 monks and 190 nuns). The banned monastic orders included Jesuits, Camaldolese, Order of Friars Minor Capuchin, Carmelites, Carthusians, Poor Clares, Order of Saint Benedict, Cistercians, Dominican Order (Order of Preachers), Franciscans, Pauline Fathers and Premonstratensians, and their wealth was taken over by the Religious Fund.

His anti-clerical and liberal innovations induced Pope Pius VI to visit Joseph II in March 1782. He received the Pope politely and presented himself as a good Catholic but refused to be influenced.

Restoration of the Jesuits
As the Napoleonic Wars were approaching their end in 1814, the old political order of Europe was to a considerable extent restored at the Congress of Vienna after years of fighting and revolution, during which the Church had been persecuted as an agent of the old order and abused under the rule of Napoleon. With the political climate of Europe changed, and with the powerful monarchs who had called for the suppression of the Society no longer in power, Pope Pius VII issued an order restoring the Society of Jesus in the Catholic countries of Europe. For its part, the Society of Jesus decided the first General Congregation held after the restoration to keep the organization of the Society as it had been before the suppression was ordered in 1773.

After 1815, with the Restoration, the Catholic Church again began to play a more welcome role in European political life. Nation by nation, the Jesuits became re-established.

The modern view is that the order's suppression resulted from political and economic conflicts rather than a theological controversy and the assertion of nation-state independence against the Catholic Church. The expulsion of the Society of Jesus from the Catholic nations of Europe and their colonial empires is also seen as one of the early manifestations of the new secularist zeitgeist of the Enlightenment. It peaked with the anti-clericalism of the French Revolution. The suppression was also seen as an attempt by monarchs to gain control of revenues and trade that the Society of Jesus previously dominated. Catholic historians often point to a personal conflict between Pope Clement XIII (1758–1769) and his supporters within the church and the crown cardinals backed by France.

See also 
 Society of the Faith of Jesus
 Jesuit clause – clause banning Jesuits from Norway from 1814 to 1956

References

Bibliography

Further reading
  also online
 Cummins, J. S. "The Suppression of the Jesuits, 1773" History Today (Dec 1973), Vol. 23 Issue 12, pp 839–848, online; popular account.
 Schroth, Raymond A. "Death and Resurrection: The Suppression of the Jesuits in North America." American Catholic Studies 128.1 (2017): 51–66.
 Van Kley, Dale. The Jansenists and the Expulsion of the Jesuits from France (Yale UP, 1975).
 Van Kley, Dale K. Reform Catholicism and the international suppression of the Jesuits in Enlightenment Europe (Yale UP, 2018); online review
 Wright, Jonathan, and Jeffrey D Burson. The Jesuit Suppression in Global Context: Causes, Events, and Consequences. Cambridge University Press, 2015.

External links
 
 Charles III of Spain's royal decree expelling the Jesuits
 Vogel, Christine: The Suppression of the Society of Jesus, 1758–1773, European History Online, Mainz: Institute of European History, 2011, retrieved: November 11, 2011.
 The Death of a Weak and Regretful Pope: September 22, 1774 at Catholic Text Book Project

18th-century Catholicism
Catholicism-related controversies
Catholic studies
Jesuit history in Europe
Jesuit history in South America
Jesuit history in North America
18th century in Portugal
18th century in Spain
18th century in France
18th century in Italy
History of Catholicism in France
History of Catholicism in Spain
History of Catholicism in Portugal
History of Catholicism in Italy
History of Catholicism in Brazil
Persecution of Catholics
Spanish colonization of the Americas
Spanish missions in the Americas
1763 disestablishments in Spain
1763 disestablishments in the Spanish Empire
Political repression
Anti-clericalism